Santa Clara River may refer to:

Santa Clara River (California), a river in Southern California
Santa Clara River (Utah), a river in Utah
Carmen River, a river in Mexico also known as the Santa Clara River